The Universal Wrestling Federation was a 1986 re-branding of wrestler-turned-owner Bill Watts' Mid-South Wrestling promotion. Watts' goal was to elevate his promotion from a relatively smaller, regional-level business, to a national-level rival of the World Wrestling Federation (WWF, now known as WWE). However, Watts' business strategy quickly swung from "overnight" success to catastrophic failure, resulting in the 1987 sale of the UWF to another rival: Jim Crockett Promotions (owner of Mid-Atlantic Wrestling, Georgia Championship Wrestling, the National Wrestling Alliance (NWA)'s most important championships, and the predecessor of World Championship Wrestling). The promotion began as an NWA territory, NWA Tri-State, founded by Leroy McGuirk in the 1950s. Tri-State/Mid-South/UWF promoted in Oklahoma, Arkansas, Louisiana and Mississippi until 1987.

Because Watts did not register the "Universal Wrestling Federation" name with the United States Patent and Trademark Office, businessman Herb Abrams was able to use it to launch an unrelated wrestling promotion of the same name in 1990.

History

NWA Tri-State (1950s–1979)
A former territory wrestler who was blinded in a 1950 auto accident, Leroy McGuirk eventually took over promoting a wrestling circuit covering Oklahoma, Louisiana and Mississippi. Until 1973, "Cowboy" Bill Watts had been one of Tri-State's most popular wrestlers. After leaving Tri-State for Eddie Graham's Championship Wrestling from Florida, Watts returned to Tri-State in 1975.

Mid-South Wrestling (1979–1986)
In 1979, Bill Watts bought the Tri-State Wrestling territory from Leroy McGuirk, and re-branded it Mid-South Wrestling (MSW; officially, the Mid-South Wrestling Association). One of Watts' first acts as owner was to withdraw the company from the National Wrestling Alliance (NWA). However, MSW would remain loosely aligned with the NWA, continuing to have the NWA World Heavyweight Champion defend the title on MSW shows, which spiked live event sales. (During the "territory" system [1940s-1980s], the NWA World Heavyweight Champion would travel to each NWA-affiliated territory to defend the title against its top-drawing local star.) MSW then added Arkansas to its circuit. In 1982, MSW expanded to Oklahoma when McGuirk closed his personal, Oklahoma-based promotion. McGuirk also formed an alliance with Houston promoter Paul Boesch to feature Mid-South talent on shows at the Sam Houston Coliseum (one of the most famous arenas in professional wrestling), and other parts of southeastern Texas. Mid-South used Shreveport, Louisiana as the base for its television tapings, which were first housed in the studios of KTBS-TV until they were moved around 1982 to the Irish McNeel Sports for Boys club, located on the Louisiana State Fairgrounds.

Instead of the cartoon-ish characters and interviews common to the Hulkamania-era WWF, Mid-South Wrestling's content focused on: energetic matches performed before raucous and packed crowds; characters whose personas blurred the line between good and evil; an intensely physical, athletic wrestling style; and an episodic TV show format. The promotion ran shows in a mix of small venues and gigantic arenas. In 1980, a card pitting a "blinded" Junkyard Dog against Freebird Michael Hayes in the main event drew nearly 30,000 fans for a show presented by a promotion less than one year old. In 1984, Watts came out of retirement to team with a masked Junkyard Dog (under the name Stagger Lee) to face the Midnight Express to cap an angle in which the Express and manager Jim Cornette beat Watts on TV. Its undercard featured a showdown between Magnum T.A. and Mr. Wrestling II. The 1984 show drew 22,000 fans—an unimaginably large crowd for a regional territory show.

In the mid-1980s, MSW began to expand nationally. In 1985, longtime wrestling fan Ted Turner invited Watts to air MSW's weekly TV show on Turner's SuperStation TBS network. Turner wanted an alternative to the World Wrestling Federation show airing in the coveted 2-hour, Saturday-evening timeslot, which the WWF had acquired when it bought out the majority ownership of Georgia Championship Wrestling. (see: Black Saturday) Turner was angered by the WWF show because McMahon had promised him it would feature matches and promos taped in TBS' Atlanta studios (as Georgia Championship Wrestling had done for years). But instead of fresh, locally-produced content, the WWF's TBS show only presented clips and highlights from other WWF TV shows – some, depending on TV market, airing at the same time the TBS show did. (Eventually, the WWF would shoot local, in-studio matches, but only infrequently, and they were usually predictable squash matches.) MSW quickly became TBS' highest-rated show, so Watts positioned MSW to take over once Turner could force the WWF off his network. Watts' luck ran out, however, when former Georgia Championship Wrestling co-owner Jim Barnett helped broker a deal enabling North Carolina-based Jim Crockett Promotions' (led by Jim Crockett, Jr.) to buy the Saturday timeslot from McMahon, and become TBS' sole pro wrestling show. Watts made one more attempt at going national the following year. As part of that plan, Watts replaced Mid-South Wrestling's parochial brandname with a more corporate, ambitious (and WWF-like) one: the Universal Wrestling Federation.

Universal Wrestling Federation (1986–1987)
In March 1986, MSW "went national" (the goal of the most ambitious regional promotions of this era), re-launching as the Universal Wrestling Federation, and securing a syndication deal airing their two one-hour, weekly TV programs (the lesser show, Power Pro Wrestling debuted in 1984) in major markets across the United States. The TV tapings were also taken out of Shreveport and moved on location at various live shows throughout the Mid-South/UWF territory. New wrestlers, mostly from World Class Championship Wrestling (WCCW), joined the company, as did former WCCW co-promoter Ken Mantell. Despite the UWF's strong early ratings and critical praise, it could not compete nationally with Jim Crockett Promotions (JCP) and the WWF, as both had stronger TV distribution and larger live event, pay-per-view (and, in the WWF's case, merchandise licensing) revenue streams. The UWF was further hurt when the oil-based economy of its richest local market—Oklahoma—fell into a severe recession in fall, 1986. This left the blue collar core of the UWF's fanbase with far less disposable income to spend on things like attending wrestling shows. 

Watts sold the UWF to JCP on April 9, 1987, and many of the UWF's top stars were either retained by JCP, or immediately left for the WWF or WCCW. Unlike the other NWA-affiliated promotions JCP had bought out in the mid-1980s, the UWF did not immediately end; JCP kept its brand—and its three championships—alive in TV storylines until December 1987, when JCP's NWA-affiliated characters defeated all of the UWF characters in a series of "title vs. title" unification matches, among others. Only a few UWF wrestlers were well-received by JCP's fanbase; they included: the Fabulous Freebirds, Shane Douglas, Rick Steiner, Eddie Gilbert, and UWF centerpiece "Dr. Death" Steve Williams. Most UWF imports were gone from JCP's roster within a year; however, one wrestler would go from UWF midcarder/tag team act, to breakout star in JCP, and the wrestling industry as a whole: Sting. Sting's UWF tag team (as The Blade Runners) partner would later become a WWF wrestling legend, too: The Ultimate Warrior.

In April 1988, JCP, one of the biggest and late stage casualties of the "going national" war with the WWF, sold its collection of territories and titles to Ted Turner's TBS. Turner re-branded JCP "World Championship Wrestling," naming the new company after its TBS TV show. Ironically, "Cowboy" Bill Watts ended up running the same business that had swallowed his own: In spring of 1992, WCW hired Watts was as its latest Executive Vice President; he held the role less than a year.

World Wrestling Entertainment acquired most of the Mid-South/UWF video archive, absorbing it into its WWE Libraries collection in 2012 -- with a notable exception: Mid-South/UWF matches taped for Houston Wrestling which aired on KHTV in Houston. Those rights are held by the estate of Paul Boesch, who was the Houston territory's promoter. Select episodes of Mid-South are available for viewing on the WWE Network.

Storylines
The Battle of New Orleans was a long-playing brawl between Eddie Gilbert, Terry Taylor, Chris Adams and Sting, which began in the ring and spilled out into the concession area. Beer kegs, chairs, tables, popcorn machine and anything the four wrestlers could get their hands on were used in the brawl which lasted nearly 15 minutes. Sting and Gilbert fought outside the ring, when Rick Steiner came in and piledrived Shane Douglas. With Taylor on top, referee Randy Anderson made the pinfall. Later, Adams came out and told Anderson what had happened, which prompted Gilbert and Taylor to gang-up on Adams. Sting came in to even the sides, and that resulted in an all-out brawl outside the ring. Gilbert was the mastermind of this famous angle and received huge praise from fellow promoters and wrestlers.

Adams was engaged in a storyline involving Iceman King Parsons and Taylor, which evolved out of the UWF Tag Team Championship tournament in February 1987. Originally, Adams and Iceman were one of the eight teams participating, and Taylor was teamed with Sam Houston. In a semi-finals match, Adams and Iceman wrestled against "Dr Death" Steve Williams and Ted DiBiase until Skandor Akbar's Devastation Inc. charged the ring to attack Williams and DiBiase. The match ended when Williams and DiBiase were counted out, and Adams and Parsons won the match. Adams, who was helping Williams and DiBiase fight off Akbar and his army, wanted the match to continue, but Parsons wanted the win. After a lengthy argument, Adams and Parsons split, and Chris chose Savannah Jack as his new tag team partner. Iceman sucker-punched Savannah during a match and injured him, thus Adams had to choose another tag partner. He chose Terry Taylor, whose team lost a semi-final match to Rick Steiner and Sting. Taylor and Adams eventually won the UWF tag team titles, and held the belts for two months.

Meanwhile, Adams and Parsons engaged in a lengthy feud, which lasted for more than a decade (the two had feuded earlier in WCCW when Adams was the heel and Parsons was the babyface), with Parsons frequently referring to Adams as "Jailbird," a reference to Adams serving jail time in 1986 on an assault conviction. Taylor and Adams, who dominated the UWF tag team scene, lost a match to Steiner and Sting when Taylor kicked Adams foot off the rope as he was being pinned by Sting. A face-vs-face bout between Adams and Taylor marked Taylor's heel turn as he piledrived Adams on the floor. The Taylor-Adams war proved to be one of the most violent feuds in the UWF, with an equal intensity to the feud Adams had with the Von Erichs in World Class. The feud did have a short interruption when Taylor was injured in an automobile accident, but picked up again by the summer and carried over to World Class by 1988. Taylor and Adams promoted a famous angle in August which involved a press conference, where Taylor spoke about his situation with Adams and then left. Chris later took questions, which prompted Taylor to attack Adams with a chair. The following week, Adams conducted an interview vowing revenge against both Taylor and Eddie Gilbert.

Other famous UWF angles included promoter Bill Watts being attacked and having the flag of the Soviet Union draped on him by Eddie Gilbert, Missy Hyatt cold-cocking John Tatum after joining forces with Gilbert, Skandor Akbar throwing a fireball at Hacksaw Jim Duggan ("blinding" him temporarily), and the Freebirds breaking Steve Williams' arm. Williams recruited Oklahoma Sooners (and future Dallas Cowboys head coach) Barry Switzer into training and getting back into the ring. It paid off on July 11, 1987 when Dr. Death defeated Big Bubba Rogers (Ray Traylor) to win the UWF Heavyweight Championship. The Freebirds became faces around that time, as they began feuding with Skandor Akbar's army as well as The Angel of Death.

A prelim wrestler, Mike Boyette, wrestled in the UWF and is believed to be one of the very few wrestlers to never win a match. Video editors for the show even put together a music video of his various losses in the ring, set to the Little River Band song "Lonesome Loser". "Gorgeous" Gary Young also competed in the UWF, claiming that he was a rookie. He actually had five years experience under his belt. Young's claims prompted Jim Ross to begin referring to him as a "five-time rookie of the year."

As the UWF's merge with "the NWA" was taking place, Terry Taylor, who held the UWF Television Championship, began an angle with the NWA World Television Champion, Nikita Koloff. Taylor stole the NWA TV title belt during an NWA show, but Koloff (with help from Dusty Rhodes) reclaimed it before their official in-ring encounter. They met at Starrcade 1987, and Nikita unified the two titles as the final leg of the NWA-UWF merger was finished. Williams would successfully defend the UWF Heavyweight Title on the same show versus Barry Windham. Williams immediately left to do a series of lucrative performances in Japan; the title was retired while he was in Asia.

Sting, Rick Steiner, Eddie Gilbert, Missy Hyatt, announcer Jim Ross, Brad Armstrong and the aforementioned Taylor became permanent NWA roster members, among others. The Freebirds, Savannah Jack, Iceman King Parsons, matchmaker Frank Dusek, and promoter Ken Mantell joined the new Wild West Wrestling promotion, which later merged with World Class Championship Wrestling. "Gentleman" Chris Adams, who initially stayed with Jim Crockett Promotions post-UWF, left due to a money dispute and returned to World Class in November 1987. DiBiase, Big Bubba Rogers, One Man Gang, and Sam Houston joined the WWF, joining fellow UWF alumnus "Hacksaw Jim Duggan", who the WWF had signed in February 1987. The Sheepherders, who originally joined Crockett after the merger, left in mid-1988 for the WWF, where they were renamed the Bushwhackers. Terry Taylor also departed, appearing in World Class for a few months (feuding with Chris Adams and Kevin Von Erich), then the WWF in mid-1988 as The Red Rooster. Taylor would go on to have a long WWF/WWE career behind-the-scenes, holding various management and creative team roles.

Former personnel

Announcers
Mid-South's main television broadcasting team included Bill Watts and Boyd Pierce, with KTBS-TV staff announcer Reisor Bowden serving as ring announcer. Jim Ross joined Mid-South after the closure of Leroy McGuirk's Tri-State promotion in Oklahoma, and remained through the transition to UWF. Bill Watts's son Joel Watts was later added to the Mid-South/UWF broadcasting team, and also worked behind-the-scenes as a producer of the TV program.

Following Jim Crockett Promotions' purchase of the UWF, both Bill and Joel Watts exited the promotion and Jim Ross was joined by various partners including Magnum T. A., Michael P.S. Hayes and Missy Hyatt. Veteran JCP announcer Bob Caudle became Ross's permanent partner near the closure of UWF. Frank Dusek and Toni Adams also served as ringside commentators during the course of its UWF tenure; both of whom moved on to World Class.

Wrestlers of NWA Tri-State/Mid-South/UWF

 Chris Adams
 Toni Adams
 Afa
 Skandor Akbar
 André the Giant
 Angel of Death
 Brad Armstrong
 Bill Ash
 The Assassin
 "Mr USA" Tony Atlas
 Ox Baker
 The Barbarian
 Jessie Barr
 Pat Barrett
 Black Bart
 Don Bass
 Brian Blair
 Tully Blanchard
 Nick Bockwinkel
 Mike Bond
 Matt Borne
 Mike Boyer
 Bruiser Brody
 Leroy Brown
 The Brute
 King Kong Bundy
 Ray Candy
 Coco Samoa
 Charlie Cook
 Wendell Cooley
 Tiger Conway Jr.
 Jim Cornette (Manager)
 Dennis Condrey
 Art Crews
 Dark Journey
 John Davidson
 Rick Davidson
 Ted DiBiase
 Shane Douglas
 Jim Duggan
 Bobby Duncum
 Frank Dusek
 Bobby Eaton
 Eli the Eliminator
 Paul Ellering
 Fishman
 Ric Flair
 The French Angel
 The Grappler
 The Grappler II
 "Gorgeous" Jimmy Garvin
 Mike George
 Robert Gibson
 Eddie Gilbert
 Terry "Bam Bam" Gordy
 "Crazy" Luke Graham
 The Great Kabuki
 Chavo Guerrero
 Hector Guerrero
 "Playboy" Garry Hart
 Stan "The Lariat" Hanson
 Freebird Michael "P. S." Hayes
 "Gorgeous" Gino Hernandez
 Hercules Hernandez (Hercules WWE)
 Tim Horner
 Mike Hudspeth
 Rock Hunter (wrestler turned manager)
 Missy Hyatt (Manager)
 The Iron Sheik
 Bill Irwin
 Savannah Jack
 Cactus Jack
 Junkyard Dog
 Leilani Kai
 Kamala
 Cajun Kenly
 Killer Khan
 King Cobra
 Krusher Khruschev
 Sonny King
 Kelly Kiniski
 "The Russian Bear" Ivan Koloff
 Nikita Koloff
 "Killer" Karl Kox
 Kortsia Korchenko
 "The Big Cat" Ernie Ladd
 Buddy Landel
 Charlie Lane
 Jose Lothario
 Arn Anderson
 Mad Dog Boyd
 Velvet McIntyre
 Dutch Mantel
 Judy Martin
 Mil Máscaras
 The Masked Superstar
 Hiro Matsuda
 Shawn Michaels
 Butch Miller
 The Missing Link
 The Mongolian Stomper
 Ricky Morton
 "King Kong" Mosca
 "Captain Redneck" Dick Murdoch
 Jim "The Anvil" Neidhart
 Mr. Olympia)
 One Man Gang
 Paul Orndorff
 Bob Orton, Jr.
 Pork Chop Cash
 "Iceman" King Parsons
 Tank Patton
 Al Perez
 David Peterson
 "Leaping" Lanny Poffo
 Big John Quinn
 Tom Renesto jr
 Johnny "Crash" Rich
 Wendi Richter
 "Hacksaw" Butch Reed
 "The American Dream" Dusty Rhodes
 Buddy Roberts
 Jake Roberts
 Col. Buck Robley 
 "Blade Runner" Rock (The Ultimate Warrior)
 Big Boss Man
 Bob Roop
 Billy Romeo
 Vinnie Romeo
 Nelson Royal
 The Russian Brute
 Brett Sawyer
 Buzz Sawyer
 Sika
 "Iron" Mike Sharpe
 Dick Slater
 Vladic Smirnoff
 Snowman 
 Bob Stabler
 Joe Stark
 Tom Statan
 Dennis Stamp
 Rick Steiner
 Sting
 Adrian Street
 Chief Jay Strongbow
 Big John Studd
 Sunshine
 The Super Destroyer
 Bob Sweetan
 Magnum T. A.
 "Hollywood" John Tatum
 Terry Taylor
 "Big" Tug Taylor
 Edcar Thomas 
 Tony Torres
 The Turk
 "Handsome" Johnny Valentine
 Jack Victory
 Doug Vines
 Nikolai Volkoff
 Kerry Von Erich
 Koko B. Ware
 "Cowboy" Bill Watts
 Luke Williams
 "Dr. Death" Steve Williams
 Barry Windham
 Ed Wiskoski
 Mr. Wrestling II
 Yoshiaki Yatsu
Gary Young
 Oliver Humperdink

Tag teams and stables

 The Fabulous Freebirds (Michael Hayes, Terry Gordy, and Buddy Roberts)
 The Samoan Warriors (Afa and Sika)
 Devastation Inc. (Skandor Akbar, The Samoan Warriors, One Man Gang, Killer Khan, Vladic Smirnoff, Savannah Jack, Leroy Brown, Ted DiBiase, Kamala, The Missing Link, and Bill Irwin )
 The Rat Pack (Ted DiBiase, Hacksaw Duggan, and Matt Borne)
 Ted DiBiase and Hacksaw Duggan
 Ted DiBiase and "Dr. Death" Steve Williams
 Ivan and Nikita Koloff
 The Lightning Express (Brad Armstrong and Tim Horner)
 Rock 'N Roll Express (Ricky Morton and Robert Gibson)
 The Jive Tones (Pez Whatley and Tiger Conway)
 The Midnight Express (Bobby Eaton and Dennis Condrey)
 Junkyard Dog and Dick Murdoch
 Junkyard Dog and Mr. Olympia
 Junkyard Dog and Killer Karl Kox
 The Sheepherders (Butch Miller and Luke Williams)
 Terry Taylor and Chris Adams
 The Blade Runners ("Blade Runner" Rock and "Blade Runner" Flash)
 Hot Stuff International, Inc. (Hot Stuff Eddie Gilbert, Rick Steiner, "Blade Runner" Rock, and "Blade Runner" Sting)
 H & H International, Inc. (Hot Stuff Eddie Gilbert, Missy Hyatt, Rick Steiner, Sting, and Jack Victory)
 John Tatum and Jack Victory
 The Bruise Brothers (Pork Chop Cash and Mad Dog Boyd)
 The Super Destroyer and The Grappler
 The Graplers (The Grappler and The Grappler #2)
 Mr. Wrestling II and Tiger Conway Jr
 Mr. Wrestling II and Col. Buck Robley
 One Man Gang and Killer Khan
 Hiro Matsuda and Yoshi Yatsu
 The Davidsons (Rick Davidson and John Davidson)
 "Hacksaw" Butch Reed and Jim "The Anvil" Neidhart
 The Pretty Young Things (Koko Ware and Norvell Austin)
 The Fantastics (Bobby Fulton and Tommy Rogers)

Championships

NWA Tri-State

Mid-South Wrestling

Universal Wrestling Federation

References

External links
 TRIBUTE PAGES for Legends of Mid-South
 Tri-State/Mid-South Title Histories
 UNIVERSAL WRESTLING ARCHIVES

 
Independent professional wrestling promotions based in the Southwestern United States
Jim Crockett Promotions
National Wrestling Alliance members
Professional wrestling in Arkansas
Professional wrestling in Louisiana
Professional wrestling in Mississippi
Professional wrestling in Oklahoma

de:Universal Wrestling Federation#UWF (Bill Watts)